Gerald Fowler may refer to:
 Gerry Fowler (Gerald Teasdale Fowler), British Labour Party politician and university academic
 Gerald Fowler (cricketer), English cricketer
 Gerald Leroy Fowler. American scientific instrument maker